Sundadanio axelrodi is a danionin in the family Cyprinidae, with origin from Borneo, Bangka, and Sumatra. Originally described as a rasbora, Rasbora axelrodi, this tiny species was later deemed to be more closely related to the danios but not enough to be moved into the genus Danio. Sundadanio axelrodi reaches a maximum size of 1.7 cm.  Sundadanio was considered monotypic until the genus was reassessed by Conway, Kottelat and Tan in 2011.

Etymology
Named in honor of pet-book publisher Herbert R. Axelrod (b. 1927), who discovered this species in the tanks of a Singapore aquarium fish exporter.

References
 Sundadanio axelrodi at danios.info
 

Sundadanio
Taxa named by Martin Ralph Brittan
Freshwater fish of Indonesia
Fish described in 1976